Eugene Joseph Good  (December 13, 1882 – August 6, 1947) was a Major League Baseball outfielder.

External links
Baseball Reference.com page

1882 births
1947 deaths
Boston Beaneaters players
Major League Baseball outfielders
Baseball players from Massachusetts
Kane Mountaineers players
Syracuse Stars (minor league baseball) players
Springfield Ponies players
Addison-Wellsville Tobacco Strippers players
New Bedford Whalers (baseball) players